Mims is a census-designated place (CDP) in Brevard County, Florida. The population was 7,058 at the 2010 United States Census.

Geography
Mims is located at  (28.668670, -80.847949).

Demographics

As of the census of 2000, there were 9,147 people, 3,591 households, and 2,574 families residing in the CDP. The racial makeup of the CDP was 86.57% White, 10.98% African American, 0.63% Native American, 0.22% Asian, 0.02% Pacific Islander, 0.26% from other races, and 1.31% from two or more races. Hispanic or Latino of any race were 1.54% of the population.

There were 3,591 households, out of which 28.6% had children under the age of 18 living with them, 55.6% were married couples living together, 11.4% had a female householder with no husband present, and 28.3% were non-families. 22.8% of all households were made up of individuals, and 10.8% had someone living alone who was 65 years of age or older.  The average household size was 2.52 and the average family size was 2.95.

In the CDP, the population was spread out, with 24.0% under the age of 18, 6.2% from 18 to 24, 26.4% from 25 to 44, 25.6% from 45 to 64, and 17.8% who were 65 years of age or older.  The median age was 41 years. For every 100 females, there were 98.3 males.  For every 100 females age 18 and over, there were 95.9 males.

Economy

Personal income
The median income for a household in the CDP was $35,216, and the median income for a family was $41,044. Males had a median income of $33,886 versus $21,925 for females. The per capita income for the CDP was $17,433.  About 11.3% of families and 15.6% of the population were below the poverty line, including 20.5% of those under age 18 and 12.4% of those age 65 or over.

Industry
Praxair in Mims produces liquid oxygen for the Kennedy Space Center.

History
Mims, Florida received its name after an early settler, Casper Neil Mims, who established a general store circa 1876.  Railroad access starting 1885 expanded the community.  By the end of the 19th century citrus farms began to dominate the local economy.

Harry T. Moore, a civil rights leader, teacher and founder of the Brevard County NAACP, was murdered in Mims with his wife, Harriette; they were fatally injured by a bomb exploding under their home on Christmas Eve, 1951. Moore died the next day; his wife died on January 3, 1952. The murder was racially motivated and believed to have been committed by members of the Ku Klux Klan. The FBI investigated the case in 1951-1952, and the county and state in the 1970s and 1990s. The state reinvestigated in 2005, after suspected perpetrators had died. No one was ever prosecuted.

Multiple sites in Mims and Brevard County are dedicated to the Moores including the Moore Memorial Park and Cultural Center in Mims.

Education 
There are two schools in Mims:

 Mims Elementary School
 Pinewood Elementary School

References

Census-designated places in Brevard County, Florida
Census-designated places in Florida
Populated places on the Intracoastal Waterway in Florida
Former municipalities in Florida